Višňová is a municipality and village in Liberec District in the Liberec Region of the Czech Republic. It has about 1,400 inhabitants.

Administrative parts
Villages of Andělka, Filipovka, Loučná, Minkovice, Poustka, Předlánce, Saň and Víska are administrative parts of Višňová.

Geography
It lies in the Frýdlant Hills. The Smědá River flows through the municipality.

History
The first written mention of Višňová is from 1334 and it is the oldest settlement in the municipality. The youngest settlement are Filipovka and Minkovice, which were founded in the 18th century.

Transport
There are two pedestrian border crossings to Poland: Višňovská / Wigancice Żytawskie and Andělka / Lutogniewice.

Sights
The landmark of Višňová is the Church of the Sending of the Holy Spirit. The church was built in 1492 and until 1945, it served evangelical services. A new nave was built in 1802–1803.

There are several timber framed houses.

Notable people
Bedřich Fritta (1906–1944), graphic artist and caricaturist

Gallery

References

External links

Villages in Liberec District